Montenegro–Turkey relations are the bilateral relations between Montenegro and Turkey. Turkey officially recognized Montenegro on June 12, 2006. Diplomatic relations between the two countries were established on July 3, 2006. Both countries are full members of the Union for the Mediterranean, Council of Europe and NATO.

Diplomatic missions
 Montenegro has an embassy in Ankara.
 Turkey has an embassy in Podgorica.

Economic relations
Total trade between the two countries in 2012 amounted to 40.1 million euros, of which imports was 28.4 million euros, and exports 11.7 million. Direct investment from the Republic of Turkey in 2012 amounted to 25 million euros.

Total trade between the two countries in 2011 amounted to 36.8 million euros, of which imports was 25.6 million euros, and exports 11.2 million. Direct investment from the Republic of Turkey in 2011 amounted to 993 281 euros.

In early December 2010, the first meeting of Montenegrin-Turkish Joint Committee, as well as the first business forum of Montenegrin and Turkish businessmen, during the visit of the Turkish Minister of Industry and Trade Nihat Ergun Montenegro.

Total trade between the two countries in 2010 amounted to 33.06 million, of which imports was 28.07 million euros, and exports 4.9 million. Direct investment from the Republic of Turkey in 2010 amounted to EUR 3.3 million.

Total trade between the two countries in 2009 amounted to 22.7 million euros, of which exports were 1.3 million, and imports 21.3 million. Direct investment from the Republic of Turkey in 2009 amounted to 523.2 thousand.

Cultural relations
Turkey continues to give scholarships to Montenegrin students within the scope of Government scholarships and Greater Student Project (BOP). With the aim of meeting the future needs of our kins living in Montenegro, with whom we also share the same religion, for well educated Imams, the Turkish Foundation for Religion provides scholarships to Montenegrin students every year.

Tourism
Turkish tourists in Montenegro:

Military cooperation
In 2018, Montenegro and Turkey deepened military ties, signing a deal stipulating defense industry cooperation regarding the "production and trade of defence goods and services, maintenance and logistical support". Before 2018, Turkey had not been considered a major military partner for Montenegro.

See also
Foreign relations of Montenegro
Foreign relations of Turkey
Accession of Montenegro to the European Union
European Union–Turkey relations
Turkey–Yugoslavia relations

References

External links
 Ministry of Foreign Affairs of Turkey about relations with Montenegro
 Ministry of Foreign Affairs of Montenegro about relations with Turkey (Montenegrin only)

 
Turkey
Modern history of Turkey
Bilateral relations of Turkey